Werner Diermaier (also known as Werner "Zappi" Diermaier) (born 1949) is a German drummer, best known as one of the founding members of the German krautrock band, Faust. Diermaier has remained with Faust for its entire lifespan and appears on all of their over 30 albums.

Biography
In 1969 Diermaier was a member of a German rock band called Campylognatus Citelli, with Hans Joachim Irmler (keyboards) and Arnulf Meifert (percussion). Later that year in Hamburg, at the suggestion of journalist and record producer Uwe Nettelbeck, they joined forces with another German rock group, Nukleus comprising Jean-Hervé Péron (bass guitar), Rudolf Sosna (guitar) and Gunther Wüsthoff (saxophone). The sextet became known as Faust and under the direction of Nettelbeck, they converted an old school-house near the village of Wümme, between Hamburg and Bremen into a studio, where they began working on their first album.

Selected discography
With Faust
Faust (1971)
Faust So Far (1972)
The Faust Tapes (1973)
Faust IV (1973)
Outside the Dream Syndicate (1973) – collaboration with Tony Conrad
The Last LP (1988) – also known as The Faust Party Album
Faust Concerts, Volume 1: Live in Hamburg, 1990 (1994)
Faust Concerts, Volume 2: Live in London, 1992 (1994)
Rien (1995)
You Know FaUSt (1996)
Edinburgh 1997 [live] (1997)
Ravvivando (1999)
Land of Ukko & Rauni [live] (2000)
Patchwork (2002)
Outside the Dream Syndicate – Alive (2005) – collaboration with Tony Conrad
Disconnected (2007) – collaboration with Nurse with Wound
C’est com... com... compliqué (2009)
Faust Rehearsals (2009)
Faust Is Last (2010)
Something Dirty (2011)
jUSt (2014)
Fresh Air (2017)
With Monobeat Original 
Arbeitstitel (2020)
Rough Mixes (2021)

Videography
Romantic Warriors IV: Krautrock (2019)

References

External links

Werner "Zappi" Diermaier homepage.
.
.

1949 births
German rock drummers
Male drummers
German male musicians
Faust (band) members
Living people